ACT Biotech Inc is a San Francisco-based, privately held biopharmaceutical company focused on the development and commercialization of targeted cancer drugs. It was founded in 2008.

The Company's clinical stage pipeline includes:

 Telatinib, an oral kinase inhibitor for the first-line treatment of advanced gastric cancer. It has been granted Orphan Drug status by the U.S. Food and Drug Administration (FDA). It has reported encouraging interim results from a phase II trial.
 ACTB1003, an oral kinase inhibitor that targets cancer cells through multiple modes of action. It inhibits cancer cell growth by targeting the FGF receptor family, which are mutated in a number of human cancer types. ACTB1003 also directly induces apoptosis by targeting kinases downstream of the PI3K pathway, all at low nanomolar concentrations.
 
Other pipeline products include an oral Aurora A and B kinase inhibitor at the pre-IND stage, and an ABL tyrosine kinase inhibitor targeting the T315I mutant enzyme in pre-clinical development.

References

External links
 actbiotech.com

Biotechnology companies of the United States
Pharmaceutical companies of the United States
2008 establishments in California
Biotechnology companies established in 2008
Health care companies based in California